Han Xu (born 31 October 1999) is a Chinese basketball player for the New York Liberty of the Women's National Basketball Association (WNBA). Han was drafted in the second round (14th overall) by the Liberty in the 2019 WNBA Draft. She has represented China at the 2016 FIBA Under-17 World Championship for Women, the 2017 FIBA Under-19 Women's Basketball World Cup and the 2018 FIBA Women's Basketball World Cup and 2022 FIBA Women's Basketball World Cup.

WNBA 
Han was drafted by the New York Liberty 14th overall in the 2019 WNBA draft. She was the youngest player in her draft class.

In her rookie season, she was the tallest player in the league and the second-tallest player in league history. She drew comparisons to male Chinese international basketball player Yao Ming.

In May 2020, it was announced that Han would sit out the 2020 WNBA season to remain in China due to the coronavirus pandemic.

National Team Career 
Han Xu was selected as Google All-Star Five in 2022 FIBA Women's Basketball World Cup. She Averaged 12.4 points, 8.4 rebounds and 1.7 blocks per game, helping China take their first silver medal since the last time the event was hosted in Australia back in 1994.  In the semi-final game versus Australia, Han Xu had a career night for China with a stunning performance as she equalled the FIBA Women's Basketball World Cup blocks record with 5 swats. She also accumulated an efficiency score of 33 after registering 19 points from 80 percent floor shooting and completing a double-double with 11 rebounds.

Career statistics

WNBA

Regular season

|-
| style="text-align:left;"| 2019
| style="text-align:left;"| New York
| 18 || 0 || 7.9 || .414 || .500 || .500 || 0.8 || 0.1 || 0.2 || 0.2 || 0.1 || 3.0
|-
| style="text-align:left;"| 2022
| style="text-align:left;"| New York
| 32 || 0 || 16.8 || .493 || .444 || .796 || 3.6 || 0.9 || 0.5 || 0.7 || 0.7 || 8.5
|-
| style="text-align:center;"| Career
| style="text-align:center;"| 2 years, 1 team
| 50 || 0 || 13.6 || .477 || .457 || .784 || 2.6 || 0.6 || 0.4 || 0.5 || 0.5 || 6.5

Playoffs

|-
| style="text-align:left;"| 2022
| style="text-align:left;"| New York
| 3 || 0 || 10.0 || .417 || 1.000 || .833 || 2.7 || 0.3 || 0.0 || 0.7 || 0.7 || 5.3
|-
| style="text-align:center;"| Career
| style="text-align:center;"| 1 year, 1 team
| 3 || 0 || 10.0 || .417 || 1.000 || .833 || 2.7 || 0.3 || 0.0 || 0.7 || 0.7 || 5.3

WCBA

Regular season

|-
| style="text-align:left;"| 2018
| style="text-align:left;"| Xinjiang
| 34 ||34 || 30.0 || .540 || .333 || .776 || 8.9 || 1.0 || 0.9 || 2.1 || 1.3 || 15.9
|-
| style="text-align:left;"| 2019
| style="text-align:left;"| Xinjiang
| 16 ||13 || 28.3 || .540 || .308 || .957 || 8.9 || 1.4 || 1.4 || 1.9 || 1.4 || 13.4
|-
| colspan=2; style="text-align:center;"| Career
| 50 || 47 || 29.5 || .540 || .312 || .811 || 8.9 || 1.1 || 1.1 || 2.0 || 1.3 || 15.0

Post-season

|-
| style="text-align:left;"| 2018
| style="text-align:left;"| Xinjiang
| 4 || 4 || 38.7 || .485 || .000 || .857 || 7.8 || 0.8 || 1.0 || 0.5 || 3.5 || 17.5
|-
| colspan=2; style="text-align:center;"| Career
| 4 || 4 || 38.7 || .485 || .000 || .857 || 7.8 || 0.8 || 1.0 || 0.5 || 3.5 || 17.5

References

External links

1999 births
Living people
Basketball players from Hebei
Centers (basketball)
Chinese women's basketball players
New York Liberty draft picks
New York Liberty players
Sportspeople from Shijiazhuang
Xinjiang Magic Deer players
Chinese expatriate basketball people in the United States
Asian Games medalists in basketball
Basketball players at the 2018 Asian Games
Asian Games gold medalists for China
Medalists at the 2018 Asian Games
Basketball players at the 2020 Summer Olympics
Olympic basketball players of China